Steve F. Levicoff is an American writer and former educator best known for his writings, in books and online, on adult higher education and distance learning, and his practical guides to law for evangelists and Christian counselors. He  directed the Institute on Religion and Law, which gave counseling on state-religion issues to organizations and government bodies.

Early life and education
Culturally Jewish American, Levicoff converted to Christianity in his youth, later being affiliated with a predominantly African-American church. He identifies as a born again evangelical.

After reading A. S. Neill's Summerhill, he dropped out of high school in the eleventh grade, started teaching adult school classes in folk guitar a few weeks later, and took the GED the day he turned 18.

Amid a varied working career, including work as a Christian radio host, he published his first book, Building Bridges: the Prolife Movement and the Peace Movement (Toviah Press, 1982), and pursued a series of academic degrees through regionally accredited, non-traditional programs for self-guided adult learners. He earned his B.A. in humanities (1987) from Thomas A. Edison State College, his M.A. in theology and law (1989) from Norwich University (through Vermont College, a component since separated from Norwich and merged into Union Institute and University), and his Ph.D. in religion and law (1991) from the Union Institute (now Union Institute and University, as above).

He also briefly attended a master's program at Simon Greenleaf School of Law in Anaheim, California, then a small, unaccredited Christian law school, which has since become part of Trinity International University.

His bachelor's was earned by distance learning, and in very large part through portfolio assessment, in which knowledge Levicoff had gained through previous work was assessed against accredited university credit courses; the graduate degrees were earned through short residency programs combining learner-guided distance education with intensive on-campus colloquia. His Project Demonstrating Excellence, Union's analogue to a doctoral dissertation, "The New Song of Shiloh: An Historical, Legal, and Theological Exploration of an Indigenous Prison Church," was a landmark exploration of Harry Theriault's controversial prison-based religion, the Church of the New Song.

Work in religion and law
After earning his doctorate, he published Christian Counseling and the Law (Moody Press, 1991), a well-received practical guide to legal issues around pastoral counseling. His later title Street Smarts: A Guide to Personal Evangelism and the Law (Baker Book House, 1994), discussed legal aspects of proselytism, religious witness such as street-corner preaching.

He wrote in The Christian Century, Christian Counseling Today, Christian Education Journal, Evangelical Journal, and Visions Magazine, and in book anthologies.

He led a small private organization, the Institute on Religion and Law in Ambler, Pennsylvania, and served as an adjunct professor in church-state issues at two fundamentalist Christian schools, Philadelphia College of Bible Graduate School (now part of Cairn University), and at Biblical Theological Seminary (now Biblical Seminary) in Hatfield, Pennsylvania.

Work in education
Levicoff's books on higher education are Name It and Frame It? New Opportunities in Adult Education and How to Avoid Being Ripped Off by "Christian" Degree Mills (Institute on Religion and Law, four editions from 1993 to 1995), and When the TRACS Stop Short: An Evaluation and Critique of the Transnational Association of Christian Colleges and Schools (Institute on Religion and Law, 1993). The second brought Levicoff a twenty-minute telephone call from Jerry Falwell, in which Falwell asked Levicoff to withdraw the book, which was critical of the accreditor. Levicoff refused, and subsequently credited the book with "hanging TRACS' reapproval by the U.S. Department of Education up for almost two years (which I like to think of as the price of Jerry's call getting me out of the shower)." Eventually, Levicoff says, TRACS "straightened out its act somewhat." His work on education has been cited by such publications as Chronicle of Higher Education.,

In these books, in media appearances, and in advocacy within non-traditional education communities on the Internet (the Usenet newsgroup alt.education.distance, subsequently degreeinfo.com and now degreediscussion.com) Levicoff has been a leading and outspoken critic of diploma mills, of nearly all unrecognized accrediting bodies, and of unaccredited institutions of higher learning, generally, where they grant academic degrees. Concerned as a consumer advocate that students might unknowingly place 'ticking time bombs' in their own résumés – and that knowing patrons might commit fraud or mask incompetence with dubious credentials – he has sought instead to popularize non-traditional programs with recognized accreditation.

He also taught educational administration at graduate school, served an adjunct faculty member at the Union Institute, and served as a preceptor (field faculty advisor) in the Master of Human Services program at Lincoln University in Pennsylvania.

References

Bibliography
Building bridges: The pro-life movement and the peace movement. Toviah Press (1982), ASIN B0006EA5KK.
Christian Counseling and the Law. Moody Publishing, 1991. 
Name It and Frame It?. Institute on Religion and Law. 1992, 1993 ASIN B0006F1PCQ
Street Smarts: A Survival Guide to Personal Evangelism and the Law. Baker Book House. (May 1994) 
When the TRACS Stop Short: An Evaluation and Critique of the Transnational Association of Christian Colleges and Schools (Institute on Religion and Law, March 1993) 

Living people
American legal writers
Cairn University
Converts to Evangelicalism from Judaism
Thomas Edison State University alumni
American gay writers
American evangelicals
Christian writers
LGBT Protestants
Christians from Pennsylvania
Norwich University alumni
Writers from Pennsylvania
Lincoln University (Pennsylvania) faculty
Year of birth missing (living people)